The chestnut bulbul or chestnut-backed bulbul (Hemixos castanonotus) is a songbird in the bulbul family, Pycnonotidae. The species was first described by Robert Swinhoe in 1870. It is found in southern China and northern Vietnam. Its natural habitat is subtropical or tropical moist lowland forests.

Taxonomy and systematics
Formerly, some authorities classified the chestnut bulbul in the genus Hypsipetes and also as a subspecies of the ashy bulbul.

Subspecies
Two subspecies are currently recognized:
 H. c. canipennis - Seebohm, 1890: Found in southern China and north-eastern Vietnam
 H. c. castanonotus - R. Swinhoe, 1870: Found in northern Vietnam and on Hainan

References

chestnut bulbul
Birds of South China
Birds of Hainan
Birds of Hong Kong
chestnut bulbul
Taxonomy articles created by Polbot